The Tamil United Liberation Front is a political party in Sri Lanka.

Formation
On 4 May 1972, several Tamil political groups, including the Federal Party (ITAK), Ceylon Workers Congress, and All Ceylon Tamil Congress formed the Tamil United Front (TUF) under the joint leadership of S.J.V. Selvanayagam, S. Thondaman, and G.G. Ponnambalam. The TUF changed its name to Tamil United Liberation Front (TULF) and adopted the demand for an independent state to be known as the "secular, socialist state of Tamil Eelam". The CWC declined to extend its support to the newly formed TULF.

1977 Parliamentary General Election
In the first general election contested by the TULF, the 1977 Sri Lankan parliamentary election, in which the UNP won by a landslide, the TULF won 6.40% of the popular vote and 18 out of 168 seats in the Sri Lankan parliament, including all 14 seats in the Northern Province.

Votes and seats won by the TULF by electoral district

The TULF became the official opposition as a result of the rout of the SLFP. The TULF's success would lead to riots in which hundreds of Tamils were murdered by Sinhalese mobs.

Throughout the 1970s and early 1980s, the TULF was frequently blamed by nationalist Sinhalese politicians for acts of violence committed by militant groups such as the Liberation Tigers of Tamil Eelam (LTTE). In fact, the TULF represented an older, more conservative generation of Tamils that felt independence could be achieved without violence, unlike the LTTE, who believed in armed conflict.

In October 1983, all the TULF legislators, numbering sixteen at the time, forfeited their seats in Parliament for refusing to swear an oath unconditionally renouncing support for a separate state in accordance with the Sixth Amendment to the Constitution of Sri Lanka.

During the 1980s, the LTTE began to see the TULF as a rival in its desire to be considered the sole representative of the Tamils of the north and east. Over the next two decades, the LTTE assassinated several TULF leaders, including A. Amirthalingam and Neelan Thiruchelvam.

1989 Parliamentary General Election
The TULF formed an alliance with the three Indian-backed paramilitary groups, Eelam National Democratic Liberation Front (ENDLF), Eelam People's Revolutionary Liberation Front (EPRLF), and Tamil Eelam Liberation Organization (TELO), to contest the 1989 Sri Lankan parliamentary election. The alliance won 3.40% of the popular vote and 10 out of 225 seats in the Sri Lankan parliament.

Votes and seats won by the TULF / ENDLF / EPRLF / TULF alliance by electoral district

1994 Parliamentary General Election
In the 1994 Sri Lankan parliamentary election, in which the People's Alliance, led by Chandrika Kumaratunga, came to power after seventeen years of UNP rule, the TULF won 1.60% of the popular vote and 5 out of 225 seats in the Sri Lankan parliament.

Votes and seats won by the TULF by electoral district

2000 Parliamentary General Election
In the 2000 Sri Lankan parliamentary election, in which the People's Alliance, led by Ratnasiri Wickremanayake, retained power, the TULF won 1.23% of the popular vote and 5 out of 225 seats in the Sri Lankan parliament.

Votes and seats won by the TULF by electoral district

2001 Parliamentary General Election

Split
TULF President V. Anandasangaree, a critic of the Tamil Tigers, left the Tamil National Alliance when it took a pro-Tamil Tigers stance in the 2004 general election. Anandasangaree gained control of the TULF after a legal battle, forcing the TULF members who wanted to remain in the TNA to resurrect the Illankai Tamil Arasu Kachchi, which is now a constituent party of the TNA.

2004 Parliamentary General Election
The legal battle over the control of the TULF meant that the party, led by V. Anandasangaree, contested as an independent group and only in one electoral district in the 2004 Sri Lankan parliamentary election, winning 0.06% of the popular vote and no seats in the Sri Lankan parliament.

Votes and seats won by the TULF by electoral district

2010 Parliamentary General Election
In the 2010 Sri Lankan parliamentary election, in which the United People's Freedom Alliance, led by Mahinda Rajapaksa, retained power, the TULF led, by V. Anandasangaree, won 0.11% of the popular vote and no seats in the Sri Lankan parliament.

Votes and seats won by the TULF by electoral district

References

External links
 
 

 
1972 establishments in Sri Lanka
Political parties established in 1972
Political parties in Sri Lanka
Secessionist organizations in Asia
Tamil Eelam
Sri Lankan Tamil nationalist parties